Marina Erakovic and Tamarine Tanasugarn were the defending champions, but Erakovic chose not to participate this year.
Tanasugarn partnered with Jill Craybas, but lost in the quarterfinals to Sun Shengnan and Zheng Jie.In the final, Sara Errani and Roberta Vinci defeated Sun and Zheng, 3–6, 6–3, [10–5].

Seeds

  Sara Errani /  Roberta Vinci (champions)
  Akgul Amanmuradova /  Renata Voráčová (quarterfinals)
  Jill Craybas /  Tamarine Tanasugarn (quarterfinals)
  Chang Kai-chen /  Sania Mirza (semifinals)

Draw

Draw

References
 Main Draw

Doubles
PTT Pattaya Open - Doubles
 in women's tennis